Waxahachie (YTB-814), sometimes misspelled Waxahatchie, was a United States Navy  named for Waxahachie, Texas.

Construction

The contract for Waxahachie was awarded 22 June 1970. She was laid down on 1 April 1971 at Sturgeon Bay, Wisconsin, by Peterson Builders and launched 9 September 1971.

Operational history

Delivered to the Navy on 4 January 1972 at Pearl Harbor, Hawaii, Waxahachie was assigned to the 14th Naval District. She continued to serve the fleet actively, providing tug and tow services, as well as pilot assistance, at the busy Pacific Fleet base at Pearl Harbor into 1980.

On 3 August 2007, was reclassified as an Unclassified miscellaneous vessel, stripped of her name and given the hull number IX-545.  For the remainder of her career, IX-545 served as a reusable target vehicle.

Stricken from the Navy Directory 27 September 2011, ex-Waxahachie awaits disposal.

References

External links

 

Natick-class large harbor tugs
Ships built by Peterson Builders
1971 ships
Unclassified miscellaneous vessels of the United States Navy